Digi may refer to:
 Short for "digital" as in digicam, digiscale, digiscrap, digibee
Digi Communications, a Romanian telecommunications company in Romania, Hungary, Spain and Italy
Digi International, an American electronics manufacturer
Digi-Key, an American electronics distributor
Digi.no, a Norwegian online newspaper
Digi Telecommunications, a Malaysian telecommunications company

See also 
 Digital (disambiguation)
Dighi (disambiguation)